The Mauritania–Senegal Border War was a conflict fought between the West African countries of Mauritania and Senegal along their shared border during 1989–1991. The conflict began around disputes over the two countries' River Senegal border and grazing rights, and resulted in the rupture of diplomatic relations between the two countries for several years, the creation of thousands of refugees from both sides, as well as having a significant impact on domestic Senegalese politics.

Background
Mauritania's south is mostly populated by the Fula/Toucouleur, Wolof, and Soninké. Senegal, meanwhile, is dominated by the Wolof.

The Senegal River basin between Mauritania and Senegal has for centuries been inhabited by both  black populations, such as the Fula/Toucouleur, Wolof, Bambara, and Soninké, and by Arabs and Berber peoples. Periods of drought throughout the 1980s increased tensions over available arable land, with the basin becoming even more important because of development of the basin by the Organisation pour la mise en valeur du fleuve Sénégal (Senegal River Basin Development Authority), which constructed dams, such as the one at Djama, that altered the balance between herders and farmers by opening new parts of the valley to irrigation. Mauritania's attempts at land reform in 1983 strengthened the role of the state while undermining traditional agriculture, making more acute the problem of many farmers on both sides of the border. Both Mauritania and Senegal are former French colonies; however, since its independence, Mauritania has sought to reinforce its Arab identity, including the strengthening of ties with the Arab world. Senegal, in comparison, remained attached to the Organisation internationale de la Francophonie, resulting in increasingly divergent foreign policies in the two countries.

These factors led to a deterioration in relations between Mauritania and Senegal, with both countries hardening their stances against each other with each further incident. This created an explosive situation that was stirred up by both countries' domestic news media, which focused heavily on the ethnic dimensions to the conflict.

Conflict

Border violence and ethnic clashes
On 9 April 1989, Diawara, a town in the Bakel Department of eastern Senegal, was the scene of clashes between Fulani herdsmen and Mauritanian Soninke farmers in Senegal over grazing rights. The Mauritanian army also took control of 1000 km2 of territory of Senegal thus coming into de facto Mauritanian control. Much of northern Senegal was seized and under the control of Mauritania after Senegal provoked Mauritania. Mauritanian border guards intervened, firing at and killing two Senegalese peasants, as well as seriously injuring several more while taking a dozen Senegalese prisoner. As a result, people on the Senegalese southern bank rioted. In Senegal, many shopkeepers were Mauritanian, and from 21 to 24 April, the shops of Mauritanian traders in Senegal where looted and burned. In addition, there were reports of professional Mauritanians being burned alive in their furnaces using spits, while others were beheaded.

The end of April saw riots in Nouakchott and other Mauritanian cities with hundreds of Senegalese being killed or otherwise injured. Both countries began expelling the nationals of the other on 28 April, resulting in further reprisals in both countries. At this time, the official figure for the number of casualties in the conflict stood at 6. Many Black Mauritanians were killed by the Muritanian police. The genocide of many Black Mauritanian happened.

Expulsions
Repatriation was done with the help of French, Algerian, Moroccan, and Spanish flights. A state of emergency and curfew were introduced in the Dakar region to prevent further violence. Senegalese President Abdou Diouf used the Senegalese army to protect the Mauritanian nationals who were being rounded up and expelled. In all 160,000 Mauritanians, the majority of them in Senegal, were repatriated.

Lynch mobs and police brutality in Mauritania resulted in the forced exile of about 70,000 southerners to Senegal, despite most of them having no links to the country. About 250,000 people fled their homes as both sides engaged in cross-border raids. Hundreds of people died in both countries.

Severing of diplomatic relations

The Senegal-Mauritanian border closed and diplomatic relations between the two countries were broken on 21 August 1989. The Organisation of African Unity tried to negotiate a settlement to reopen the border, but it was ultimately an initiative of Senegalese President Abdou Diouf which led to a treaty being signed on July 18, 1991. The treaty helped result in the re-established of relations, which took place in April 1992, and the border was reopened on 2 May 1992.

Mauritanian refugees slowly trickled back into the country during the following years. The armed black nationalist Mauritanian movement African Liberation Forces of Mauritania is based in northern Senegal.

Aftermath
The departure of massive numbers of people lead to an incredible disruption in the balance of the Senegal river valley, causing a decline in agricultural production and an increase in deforestation. In Mauritania the construction and fishing industries, which were traditionally staffed by the Senegalese, also suffered from the expulsions. The water, sanitation, and general infrastructure of the Senegalese bank of the river, already operating at peak capacity, was overwhelmed by the sheer number of refugees. The Senegalese population centers of Podor and Matam saw their populations grow by 13.6% and 12% respectively. The populations of some other villages in Senegal doubled.

In terms of domestic politics in Senegal, the conflict may have contributed to the rise of the PDS and Abdoulaye Wade due to the then governments inability to deal with the social crisis caused by the influx of vast numbers of refugees. Senegal was further undermined by its neighbors following the war, with problems arising over the demarcation of the border with Guinea-Bissau in the wake of the conflict, and difficulties with the Gambia leading to the dissolution of the Senegambia Confederation in 1989. The period of conflict has also had a lasting impact on relations between Mauritania and Senegal as well as domestic perceptions of each other.

Refugee repatriation
In June 2007, the Mauritanian government under President Sidi Ould Cheikh Abdallahi asked the United Nations High Commissioner for Refugees (UNHCR) to help it repatriate black Mauritanians who had been forced out in the war and were living in refugee camps in Mali and Senegal. The UNHCR assisted 24,272 Mauritanians living in Senegal to repatriate between January 2008 and March 2012, when the program ended.

According to UNHCR estimates, there were 6,000 refugees in Mali as of July 2007 and 14,000 refugees in Senegal as of October 2012.

References

External links
HRW Report

1989 in Mauritania
1989 in Senegal
1990 in Mauritania
1990 in Senegal
1991 in Mauritania
1991 in Senegal
1989 riots
Conflicts in 1989
Conflicts in 1990
Conflicts in 1991
Race riots
Wars involving the states and peoples of Africa
Wars involving Mauritania
Wars involving Senegal
Territorial disputes of Senegal
Territorial disputes of Mauritania
Mauritania–Senegal border
Mauritania–Senegal military relations